Mike Hammond (born 21 February 1990) is a British ice hockey player for Nottingham Panthers of the Elite Ice Hockey League and the British national team.

He previously played for German Oberliga side Hannover Scorpions.

He represented Great Britain at the 2019 IIHF World Championship and the 2021 IIHF World Championship.

References

External links

1990 births
Living people
Braehead Clan players
Brampton Beast players
British expatriate ice hockey people
English emigrants to Canada
English expatriate sportspeople in the United States
Cincinnati Cyclones (ECHL) players
Coventry Blaze players
Cowichan Valley Capitals players
English ice hockey forwards
Frederikshavn White Hawks players
Hannover Scorpions players
Kelowna Rockets players
Lausitzer Füchse players
Manchester Storm (2015–) players
Nottingham Panthers players
Odense Bulldogs players
Salmon Arm Silverbacks players
Sportspeople from Brighton
Victoria Grizzlies players
English expatriate sportspeople in Denmark
English expatriate sportspeople in Germany
Canadian expatriate ice hockey players in the United States
Canadian expatriate ice hockey players in Denmark
Canadian expatriate ice hockey players in Germany
Ice hockey people from British Columbia